Ghulam Khamis was an Omani footballer during the 1980s who played for the national team and the Muscat-based club, Al Ahli (currently Ahli-Sidab).

He died on 10 November 2008, at the age of 44 while in a Thailand hospital two months before Oman went to win their first Gulf Cup title ever in 2009. He is still remembered throughout Oman today, and is regarded as one of Oman's finest footballers.

References

Omani footballers
Oman international footballers
2008 deaths
1964 births

Association footballers not categorized by position